Præstø County is a former province in Denmark, located on the southern part of Zealand. 

It was established in 1750 as a merger between Tryggevælde County and Vordingborg County. Møn County was added in 1803.

It was abolished in 1970, merging with Maribo County to form Storstrøm County.

Præstø County featured the market towns (købstæder) of Præstø, Næstved, Stege, Store Heddinge and Vordingborg.

List of former hundreds (herreder)
Bjæverskov Herred
Bårse Herred
Fakse Herred
Hammer Herred
Mønbo Herred
Stevns Herred
Tybjerg Herred

List of County Governors
 1803 – 1808: Rudolph Bielke
 1808 – 1823: Christian Conrad Sophus Danneskiold-Samsøe
 1823 – 1824: Ehrenreich Kristoffer Ludvig Moltke
 1824 – 1831: Sigismund Ludvig Schulin
 1831 – 1836: Hans Schack Knuth
 1836 – 1836: Jens Andreas Graah
 1837 – 1849: Johan Ferdinand de Neergaard[1]
 * 1849 – 1885: Fritz Brun (konstitueret det første år)

See also
 Præstø

This article incorporates material from the corresponding article on the Danish Wikipedia, accessed 1 May 2007.

Counties of Denmark dissolved in 1970